Ivan Žiga (born 21 August 1972) is a Slovak footballer. He currently plays for Kremser SC in the 2. HNL.

External links
 Ivan Ziga's Profile at Soccer.Azplayers.com Website
 Ivan Ziga's Profile at FootballWorldsGame Website

1972 births
Living people
Slovak footballers
Expatriate footballers in Malaysia
Association football midfielders
Kremser SC players